Ralph Werner Thomas (born December 16, 1929) is a former American football end in the National Football League for the Washington Redskins and the Chicago Cardinals.

Biography 
He graduated from St. Catherine's High School (Racine, Wisconsin) Class of 1947. After high school, he played for the Racine Raiders. He attended the University of San Francisco from 1948 to 1951 and was a member of the 1951 San Francisco Dons football team. In 1955, while playing for the Redskins, he set the unofficial record for fastest consecutive TD at 0:02.7 seconds. He was featured in the 2014 documentary '51 Dons.

Awards and honors
 1979 University of San Francisco Athletic Hall of Fame
 2000 St. Catherine's High School Alumni Hall of Fame

References

1929 births
Living people
Sportspeople from Kenosha, Wisconsin
American football wide receivers
San Francisco Dons football players
Chicago Cardinals players
Washington Redskins players
Players of American football from Wisconsin